"I Was Wrong" is a song by the punk rock band, Social Distortion, originally released as a CD5 by Sony 550 Music in 1996. It then appeared on the studio release, White Light, White Heat, White Trash, followed by Live at the Roxy. The 2007 re-recording of this song is a playable track on Rock Band 2.

Background
The song is said to be a "sing-along act of contrition". It expresses the pain the singer feels at the negative, rebellious attitude he took toward the world when he was young, from his losing battle against society to the pains of love, and finishes with the chorus:

I was wrong
Self destruction's got me again
I was wrong
I realize now that I was wrong.

Charts

References

External links
Video at SocialDistortion.com
QuickTime Audio at SocialDistortion.com

1996 singles
Social Distortion songs
Songs written by Mike Ness
Epic Records singles
1996 songs
Song recordings produced by Michael Beinhorn